Simon Maurberger (born 20 February 1995) is an Italian World Cup alpine ski racer.

He competed at the FIS Alpine World Ski Championships 2019, winning a medal.

References

External links
 
 
 

1995 births
Living people
Italian male alpine skiers
People from Ahrntal
Germanophone Italian people
Alpine skiers of Centro Sportivo Carabinieri
Sportspeople from Südtirol